Glenn R. Khobuntin (born September 7, 1991) is a Filipino professional basketball player for the TNT Tropang Giga of the Philippine Basketball Association (PBA).

High school career

Khobuntin, a Cagayan de Oro native, studied high school at the Colegio de San Juan de Letran, where he was a star player for their junior varsity squad, the Letran Squires. During his high school years at Letran, he was invited to the Nike Elite Camp in 2009 along with other high school standouts and future PBA draft batchmates Baser Amer, Keith Agovida, Nico Elorde, Aljon Mariano, Troy Rosario, and Mark Cruz.

College career

Khobuntin was immediately recruited by NU Bulldogs coach Eric Altamirano after he finished high school. The offer to play for National University was the first and only scholarship offer he received as he did not entertain offers other schools. He first suited up for the Bulldogs in 2010. In his last game with NU, he posted 10 points in helping the school win its first championship after 60 years.

College averages

Amateur career

While in the amateur ranks, Khobuntin suited up for several PBA D-League teams - Boracay Rum, BDO-NU Bulldogs, FEU-MJM Builders, and Jumbo Plastic.

Professional career
Khobuntin was drafted tenth overall by the NLEX Road Warriors in the 2015 PBA draft.

PBA career statistics

As of the end of 2021 season

Season-by-season averages
 
|-
| align=left | 
| align=left | NLEX
| 34 || 13.5 || .404 || .188 || .613 || 1.6 || .4 || .1 || .1 || 4.0
|-
| align=left rowspan=2| 
| align=left | NLEX
| rowspan=2|31 || rowspan=2|18.8 || rowspan=2|.371 || rowspan=2|.241 || rowspan=2|.554 || rowspan=2|3.0 || rowspan=2|1.1 || rowspan=2|.2 || rowspan=2|.2 || rowspan=2|6.4
|-
| align=left | Mahindra / Kia
|-
| align=left | 
| align=left | Kia / Columbian
| 31 || 19.3 || .367 || .233 || .469 || 2.2 || 1.3 || .2 || .1 || 6.3
|-
| align=left | 
| align=left | Columbian
| 29 || 23.5 || .436 || .369 || .649 || 2.3 || .8 || .5 || .1 || 7.3
|-
| align=left | 
| align=left | Terrafirma
| 10 || 19.9 || .373 || .318 || .692 || 2.4 || .7 || .1 || .1 || 7.8
|-
| align=left | 
| align=left | TNT
| 32 || 13.1 || .432 || .360 || .743 || 2.2 || .3 || .2 || .0 || 4.8
|-class=sortbottom
| align=center colspan=2 | Career
| 167 || 17.6 || .396 || .287 || .610 || 2.2 || .8 || .2 || .1 || 5.8

International career

Khobuntin saw action in the 2015 Southeast Asian Games and 2015 SEABA Championship, where the Gilas Cadets team won gold medals on both occasions.

Personal life

Khobuntin was born to parents Dante and Jocelyn Khobuntin.

References

1991 births
Living people
Basketball players from Misamis Oriental
Colegio de San Juan de Letran alumni
Competitors at the 2015 Southeast Asian Games
Filipino men's 3x3 basketball players
Filipino men's basketball players
NLEX Road Warriors players
Philippine Basketball Association All-Stars
Philippines men's national basketball team players
Philippines national 3x3 basketball team players
Power forwards (basketball)
Small forwards
Southeast Asian Games gold medalists for the Philippines
Southeast Asian Games medalists in basketball
Sportspeople from Cagayan de Oro
Terrafirma Dyip players
NU Bulldogs basketball players
NLEX Road Warriors draft picks
TNT Tropang Giga players